Spirit FC may refer to:

In Australia
 Bundaberg Spirit FC, an association football team from Bundaberg
 Fremantle Spirit FC, an association football team from Fremantle
 GHFA Spirit FC, the association football team of the Gladesville-Hornsby Football Association, Sydney
 Northern Spirit FC, a former National Soccer League team from North Sydney, disbanded 2004

In New Zealand
 Coastal Spirit FC, an association football team from Christchurch.
 Southland Spirit FC, an association football team from Invercargill.